Clive Barda (born 14 January 1945) is a British freelance photographer. His career has spanned nearly fifty years, during which he produced more than a million photographs of classical musicians (including composers and conductors) and artists of the stage (opera, ballet and theatre).

This list is a selection of Barda's better-known photographs from the book Performance!, published in 2000. In her review of the book for The Guardian, Charlotte Higgins stated: "Over the past 30 years, Barda has photographed anyone who is anyone in music, from late, great luminaries such as Lucia Popp, Olivier Messiaen, Benjamin Britten and Charles Groves to today's young stars such as Evgeny Kissin, David Daniels and Cecilia Bartoli. For a new book of his photographs, Performance, an extraordinary 750,000 pictures were whittled down to a final selection of just over 150; some of them are formal portraits, but most of them are shots of musicians in action."

Selected works
The table below provides the following information:

 (title of the table) – including the period during which the photographs were taken
 Year – the year the photograph was taken (this column is sortable) 
 Subject – the person(s) photographed (this column is sortable)
 Location – the place where the photograph was taken (this column is sortable)
 Date – the date when the photograph was taken (this column is not sortable)
 Page – the page number where the photograph appears in the book (this column is not sortable).

References

Barda, Clive